Lonelyhearts, also known as Miss Lonelyhearts, is a 1958 American drama film directed by Vincent J. Donehue. It is based on the 1957 Broadway play by Howard Teichmann, which in turn is based on the 1933 novel Miss Lonelyhearts by Nathanael West.

The film stars Montgomery Clift, Robert Ryan, Myrna Loy, Jackie Coogan, Dolores Hart, and Maureen Stapleton in her first film role. Stapleton was nominated for an Academy Award for Best Supporting Actress, as well as for a Golden Globe for her performance as Fay Doyle.

Plot
The story opens on a small-town street. A man throws a bundle of papers onto the sidewalk from the back of a truck labeled Chronicle. Adam White is sitting in a bar when a woman offers him a drink. He refuses, explaining that alcohol seems to be poisonous to him. After talking with her for a while, he learns she is married to William Shrike, Editor-in-Chief of the Chronicle, where Adam is hoping to work. The editor shows up to meet his wife only to find her talking with Adam. When Shrike asks how Adam found him, Adam explains: "I heard there was a bar where newspaper people hang out. I came here since it is the closest to the Chronicle, the only paper in town". Florence Shrike says Adam can write, and he deserves the chance to prove it. Shrike retorts: "OK, so write!" Adam hems and haws momentarily, but then delivers the following story: "The Chronicle is pleased to announce the addition of a new member to our staff. He met the Editor in Chief, who went so far as to insult his own wife in an effort to provoke the new staff member. Instead of punching the editor in the face, he accepted a position on the paper."

Adam tells his girlfriend Justy about his new job. He doesn't tell her about his father, a man named Lassiter, who is doing 25 years in prison for having murdered Adam's mother and her lover. On his first day at the newspaper, Adam is astounded at being assigned the "Miss Lonelyhearts" advice-to-the-lovelorn column. One of his colleagues, reporter Ned Gates, is disappointed, having wanted that column for himself, while another, Frank Goldsmith, openly mocks the readers who seek the column's heartfelt advice.

After a few weeks, Shrike refuses a request by Adam to give him a different assignment. He also insists that Adam personally contact the letter writers to substantiate their stories. Adam randomly selects a letter from a Fay Doyle and meets her. She relates how her husband, Pat, came home from the war crippled and impotent. As they share a lonely moment, Adam and Fay are briefly thrown together sexually. When he declines meeting her a second time, she is furious.

Adam decides to leave the newspaper for good. Justy's father offers her a trust endowment to get their new life under way. At a party in the bar, Pat Doyle turns up with a gun. Adam manages to talk him out of using it. He leaves, whereupon Shrike decides to give some flowers for his own neglected wife.

Cast

 Montgomery Clift as Adam White
 Robert Ryan as William Shrike
 Myrna Loy as Florence Shrike
 Dolores Hart as Justy Sargeant
 Maureen Stapleton as Fay Doyle
 Jackie Coogan as Ned Gates
 Mike Kellin as Frank Goldsmith
 Onslow Stevens as Mr. Lassiter
 Frank Maxwell as Pat Doyle
 Frank Overton as Mr. Sargeant
 John Gallaudet as Johnny, Bartender
 Don Washbrook as Don Sargeant
 Johnny Washbrook as Johnny Sargeant 
 J.B. Welch as Charlie
 Mary Alan Hokanson as Edna

Background and production
The film was Dore Schary's first film as an independent producer after leaving MGM.

Nathanael West's 1933 novel, on which this film was based, was adapted for the screen in 1933 as Advice to the Lovelorn starring Lee Tracy. It was made by Twentieth Century Pictures, distributed by United Artists, and directed by Alfred L. Werker from a screenplay by Leonard Praskins. The 1933 film was more of a comedy-drama than this version.

Howard Teichmann adapted the novel into a stage play, entitled Miss Lonelyhearts, which opened on Broadway at the Music Box Theatre on October 3, 1957. The production, directed by Alan Schneider and designed by Jo Mielziner, ran for only twelve performances.

See also
 List of American films of 1958

References

External links
 
 
 

1958 films
Film noir
American black-and-white films
Films based on American novels
American films based on plays
United Artists films
Films with screenplays by Nathanael West
American drama films
1958 drama films
Films based on adaptations
1950s English-language films
1950s American films